Pakkiriswamy Chandra Sekharan (15 April 1934 – 11 July 2017) was an Indian forensic expert, writer and a former director of the Department of Forensics Sciences of the Government of Tamil Nadu. He was best known for his contributions in the investigations in the Rajiv Gandhi assassination case.

Born on 15 April 1934 at Nagapattinam, a coastal town in the south Indian state of Tamil Nadu, Chandra Sekharan secured his graduate and post-graduate degrees from Annamalai University and did doctoral research to obtain a PhD in forensic science from the University of Madras in 1986. He was the president of the Forensics International and has published several articles on the subject of forensics, including Studies on certain forensic aspects of skull identification and individualization, and Forensic science--as is what is and a monograph, Lip forensics : forensic cheiloscopy for crime investigation and criminal identification : labial structure for personal appearance identification and personal identification. The Government of India awarded him the third highest civilian honour of the Padma Bhushan, in 2000, for his contributions to society. He was married to Evelyn  and the couple had a daughter, Meena.

Chandra Sekharan died on 11 July 2017, following a brief illness.

See also 
 Assassination of Rajiv Gandhi
 List of Madras University alumni

References

External links 
 

1934 births
2017 deaths
Recipients of the Padma Bhushan in science & engineering
People from Nagapattinam district
Medical doctors from Tamil Nadu
Annamalai University alumni
University of Madras alumni
Indian forensic scientists
Indian scientific authors
20th-century Indian medical doctors